Chub-e Arjaneh (also Romanized as Chūb-e Arjaneh; also known as Chūb-e Arjank) is a village in Gerit Rural District, Papi District, Khorramabad County, Lorestan Province, Iran. At the 2006 census, its population was 34, in 7 families.

References 

Towns and villages in Khorramabad County